Isabella is a populated place situated in Luzerne Township in Fayette County, Pennsylvania, United States.

References

Unincorporated communities in Fayette County, Pennsylvania
Unincorporated communities in Pennsylvania